Wason is a surname of Scottish origin.

People who hold this name include:
Betty Wason, American news correspondent  
Cathcart Wason, Scottish farmer and politician 
Edward Hills Wason, American politician from New Hampshire
Eugene Wason, Scottish lawyer and politician  
Nat Wason, English musician in Haven (band)
Peter Cathcart Wason, British psychologist, inventor of Wason selection task 
Rigby Wason, Scottish lawyer and politician
Robert Wason (Maryland politician), American politician from Maryland
Robert Alexander Wason, American writer of Western novels
Robert Wason Jr., American politician from Wisconsin
Sandys Wason, English clergyman and writer
Wendy Wason (active from 1997), Scottish writer, comedian and actress
Wason Renteria, Colombian footballer in Brazil

See also
Wason Manufacturing Company, an American manufacturer of railway carriages and streetcars 
Wason-Springfield Steam Power Blocks, a historic site in Massachusetts 
 

Surnames of Scottish origin